Conan, the sword-and-sorcery character created by Robert E. Howard, is the protagonist of seven major comic series published by Dark Horse Comics. The first series, titled simply Conan, ran for 50 issues from 2004 to 2008; the second, titled Conan the Cimmerian, began publication in 2008 and lasted 25 issues until 2010; the third series, titled Conan: Road of Kings, started publishing in December 2010 and ended in January 2012 after 12 issues; a fourth series, titled Conan the Barbarian, continuing from Road of Kings, lasted 25 issues from February 2012 to March 2014; a fifth series, titled Conan the Avenger, started publishing in April 2014 and ended in April 2016 after 25 issues; a sixth and final series, titled Conan the Slayer lasted 12 issues from July 2016 to August 2017.

Another series, titled King Conan, which takes place during Conan's time as king, ran in parallel for 24 issues from February 2011 to March 2016. Dark Horse also published half a dozen one-shots and almost a dozen mini-series.

Dark Horse also published collections of the original Marvel Comics Conan the Barbarian, The Savage Sword of Conan [the Barbarian] and King Conan series in graphic novel format.

The publishing rights for Conan the Barbarian returned to Marvel Comics in 2018.

Overview
Dark Horse Comics began their take on Conan in 2003 with a one-shot prologue, Conan #0: Conan the Legend.

The Conan, Conan the Cimmerian, Conan: Road of Kings, Conan the Barbarian, Conan the Avenger and Conan the Slayer series incorporate both new material and adaptations of stories by Robert E. Howard, with no other connection to Marvel Comics series or other post-Howard material. An ongoing dialogue between two characters, the Prince and the Wazir, living in an age centuries in Conan's future, is often used as a framing device for the stories.

Each issue also contains "The Adventures of Two-Gun Bob (True Stories from the Life of Robert E. Howard)" by Jim & Ruth Keegan.

Core appearances
Conan #0: The Legend (2003), 1 issue.
Conan (2004–2008), 50 issues.
Conan and the Daughters of Midora (2004), 1 issue.
Conan and the Jewels of Gwahlur (2005), 3 issues.
Conan and the Demons of Khitai (2005–2006), 4 issues.
Conan: Book of Thoth (2006), 4 issues.
Conan: Free Comic Book Day Edition (2006), 1 issue.
Conan and the Songs of the Dead (2006), 5 issues.
Hyborian Adventures: SDCC Free Giveaway (2006), 1 issue.
Conan and the Midnight God (2007), 5 issues.
Conan: Trophy (2007), 1 online eight-page issue.
Conan the Cimmerian (2008–2010), 26 issues.
Conan and the Mad King of Gaul (2009), 2 online eight-page issues.
Conan: The Weight of the Crown (2010), 1 issue.
Conan: Kiss of the Undead (2010), 1 online eight-page issue.
Conan: Road of Kings (2010–2012), 12 issues.
Robert E. Howard's Savage Sword (2010–2015), 10 issues.
King Conan (2011–2016), 24 issues.
Conan: Island of No Return (2011), 2 issues.
Conan the Barbarian (2012–2014), 25 issues.
Conan: Children of the Sun (2012), 1 online eight-page issue.
Conan: The Phantoms of the Black Coast (2012–2013), 5 issues.
Conan and the People of the Black Circle (2013–2014), 4 issues.
Conan the Avenger (2014–2016), 25 issues.
Conan/Red Sonja (2015), 4 issues.
Red Sonja/Conan (2015), 4 issues.
Conan the Slayer (2016–2017), 12 issues.
Wonder Woman/Conan (2017–2018), 6 issues.

Conan
The six main Dark Horse Conan series, Conan, Conan the Cimmerian, Conan: Road of Kings, Conan the Barbarian, Conan the Avenger and Conan the Slayer make up a larger continuous storyline. This is indicated by numbering on the inner cover of these books with the text, "Number [#] in a series".

Conan
Conan was Dark Horse Comics' first series about Conan the Cimmerian. The comic's art consists of only color and pencilwork, with no inkwork, providing a painterly aesthetic. The series follows Dale Rippke's "Darkstorm" chronology.  The story "Helm" in Conan #18 addresses one of the major "faults" in that chronology.

Controversy

Starting at issue #24, Tony Harris became the cover artist.  One of the first pieces of art Harris submitted to Conan editor Scott Allie was a fully nude version of the cover of #24.  Allie inserted the artwork in a blurb at the back of Conan and the Demons of Khitai #3.  This displeased some comic store owners, and Conan and the Demons of Khitai #3 was reprinted with a censored cover in the blurb.  Even so, 4,000 copies of Conan #24 were printed with the nude cover, and distributed through the Diamond Dateline retail newsletter shrink-wrapped in black plastic.

Awards
4 Will Eisner Comic Industry Awards
Best Single Issue or One-Shot: Conan #0: "The Legend "
4 Eagle Awards
Favourite new comicbook: Conan

Conan the Cimmerian
Conan the Cimmerian was Dark Horse Comics' second series about Conan. A 99¢ issue #0 was published June 2008, followed by the first issue of the series in July (with the usual cover price of $2.99). The series ended with issue #25 in November 2010.

Conan: Road of Kings
Conan: Road of Kings was Dark Horse Comics' third series about Conan. It featured Roy Thomas as the writer and Mike Hawthorne as the primary artist on the series.

Conan the Barbarian
Conan the Barbarian was Dark Horse Comics' fourth series about Conan. Brian Wood's run on the series was twenty-five issues and expanded on Robert E. Howard's original story "Queen of the Black Coast".

Conan the Avenger
Conan the Avenger was Dark Horse Comics' fifth series about Conan, with Fred Van Lente as the writer.

Conan the Slayer
Conan the Slayer was Dark Horse Comics' sixth and final series about Conan, with Cullen Bunn as the writer. Subsequently, the publishing rights reverted to Marvel in 2018.

Conan (mini-series and one-shots)
In addition to the larger series, there are also several miniseries and one shots.

Conan: The Phantoms of the Black Coast was originally published as an ePlate exclusive miniseries. The back-ups in these issues were reprinted from Robert E. Howard's Savage Sword, and were later collected in the trade paperbacks for that series.

King Conan (series of mini-series)
King Conan was a miniseries about Conan during his time as king of Aquilonia.

Collections

Conan

Conan super-sized collections

Conan Omnibus TPB

Conan (mini-series and one-shots)
Some of these collections also collect issues from the Conan line of comics, yet they were not collected as part the chronological collections.

King Conan

Adaptations of Robert E. Howard's original stories

Conan adapts these stories:
 "The Frost-Giant's Daughter": Issue 2.
 "The God in the Bowl": Issues 10 & 11.
 "The Tower of the Elephant": Issues 20–22.
 "The Hall of the Dead": Issues 29–31.
 "Rogues in the House": Issues 41–44.
 "The Hand of Nergal": Issues 47–50.

Conan the Cimmerian adapts these stories:   
 "Black Colossus": Issues 8–13.
 "Shadows in the Moonlight": Issues 22–25.

Conan the Barbarian adapts these stories:   
 "Queen of the Black Coast": Issues 1–3 and 22–25.

Conan the Avenger adapts these stories:
 "The Snout in the Dark": Issues 1–6.
 "The Slithering Shadow" ("Xuthal of the Dusk"): Issues 13–15.
 "A Witch Shall be Born": Issues 20–25.

Conan the Slayer adapts these stories:
 "The Devil in Iron": Issues 7–12.

The People of the Black Circle (mini-series) adapts:
 "The People of the Black Circle"

Conan And the Jewels of Gwahlur (mini-series) adapts:
 "Jewels of Gwahlur" ("The Servants of Bit-Yakin")

King Conan adapts these stories:
 "The Scarlet Citadel": Issues 1–4.
 "The Phoenix on the Sword": Issues 5–8.
 "The Hour of the Dragon": Issues 9–20.
 "Wolves Beyond the Border": Issues 21–24.

Collections of Marvel Comics comics

The Chronicles of Conan

This 34-volume series collects the complete run of Marvel Comics' Conan the Barbarian (unless noted), digitally re-coloured.

By Roy Thomas and Barry Windsor-Smith (unless noted):

Volume 1: Tower of the Elephant and Other Stories (2003) – collects issues 1–8.
Volume 2: Rogues In the House and Other Stories (2003) – collects issues 9–13, 16.
Volume 3: The Monster of the Monoliths and Other Stories (2003) – collects issues 14–15, 17–21 (also by Gil Kane).
Volume 4: The Song of Red Sonja and Other Stories (2004) – collects issues 23–26 and Red Nails, originally published in Savage Tales 2 & 3.

By Roy Thomas and John Buscema (unless noted):

Volume 5: The Shadow In the Tomb and Other Stories (2004) – collects issues 27–34.
Volume 6: The Curse of the Golden Skull and Other Stories (2004) – collects issues 35–42 (also by Neal Adams and Rich Buckler).
Volume 7: The Dweller In the Pool and Other Stories (2005) – collects issues 43–51.
Volume 8: Brothers of the Blade and Other Stories (2005) – collects issues 52–59 (also by Mike Ploog).
Volume 9: Riders of the River-Dragons and Other Stories (2006) – collects issues 60–63, 65, 69–71 (also by Val Mayerik).
Volume 10: When Giants Walk the Earth and Other Stories (2006) – collects issues 72–77, 79–81 (also by Howard Chaykin).
Volume 11: The Dance of the Skull and Other Stories (2007) – collects issues 82–86, 88–90 (also by Howard Chaykin).
Volume 12: The Beast King of Abombi and Other Stories (2007) – collects issues 91, 93–100.
Volume 13: Whispering Shadows and Other Stories (November 2007) – collects issues 92, 101–107 (also by Sal Buscema).
Volume 14: Shadow of the Beast and Other Stories (2008) – collects issues 108–115.

By J. M. DeMatteis and John Buscema and Others
Volume 15: The Corridor of Mullah-Kajar and Other Stories (July 2008) – collects issues 116–121 and Conan Annual #2
Volume 16: The Eternity War and Other Stories (December 2008) – collects issues 122–126 and Conan Annual #4–5

By J. M. DeMatteis, Bruce Jones, Gil Kane, and Others
Volume 17: The Creation Quest and Other Stories (February 2009) – collects issues 127–134 and Conan Annual #6.

By Bruce Jones and John Buscema and others
Volume 18: The Isle of the Dead and Other Stories (September 2009) – collects issues 135–142.
Volume 19: Deathmark and Other Stories (June 2010) – collects issues 143–150.

By Michael Fleisher and John Buscema and others
Volume 20: Night of the Wolf and Other Stories (December 2010) – collects issues 151–159.
Volume 21: Blood of the Titan and Other Stories (August 2011) – collects 160–167 and Conan Annual #7.
Volume 22: Reavers In the Borderland and Other Stories (July 2012) – collects Conan Annuals #8 and #9, and issues 168–173.

By Jim Owsley and John Buscema and others
Volume 23: Well of Souls and Other Stories (April 2013) – collects issues 174–181 and Conan Annual #10.
Volume 24: Blood Dawn and Other Stories (July 2013) – collects issues 182–189 and Conan Annual #11.
Volume 25: Exodus and Other Stories (November 2013) – collects issues 190–198.
Volume 26: Legion of the Dead and Other Stories (April 2014) – collects issues 199–205 and Conan Annual #12.
Volume 27: Sands Upon the Earth and Other Stories (July 2014) – collects issues 206–214 and Handbook of the Conan Universe.

By Charles Santino and Val Semeiks and others
Volume 28: Blood And Ice and Other Stories (December 2014) – collects issues 215–223.

By Gerry Conway and others
Volume 29: The Shape In the Shadow and Other Stories (March 2015) – collects issues 224–232.

By Michael Higgins and others
Volume 30: The Death of Conan and Other Stories (December 2015) – collects issues 233–240.

By Roy Thomas, Gary Hartle, Michael Docherty, and others
Volume 31: Empire of the Undead and Other Stories (March 2016) – collects issues 241–249.
Volume 32: The Second Coming of Shuma-Gorath and Other Stories (August 2016) – collects issues 250–258.
Volume 33: The Mountain Where Crom Dwells and Other Stories (November 2016) – collects issues 259–267.
Volume 34: Betrayal in Zamora and Other Stories (March 2017) – collects issues 268–275.

The Savage Sword of Conan
This 22-volume series collects the complete run of Marvel Comics' The Savage Sword of Conan.

The Chronicles of King Conan

This 11-volume series collects the complete run of Marvel Comics' King Conan, with five issues in each volume:

 Volume 1 – The Witch of the Mists and Other Stories Written by Roy Thomas, Art by John Buscema, Ernie Chan and Danny Bulanadi.
 Volume 2 – Vengeance From the Desert and Other Stories Written by Roy Thomas and Doug Moench. Art by John Buscema and Ernie Chan.
 Volume 3 – The Haunter of the Cenotaph and Other Stories
 Volume 4 – The Prince Is Dead and Other Stories
 Volume 5 – The Black Dragons and Other Stories
 Volume 6 – A Death In Stygia and Other Stories
 Volume 7 – Day of Wrath and Other Stories
 Volume 8 – The Road To Empire and Other Stories
 Volume 9 – The Blood of the Serpent and Other Stories
 Volume 10 – The Warlord of Koth and Other Stories
 Volume 11 – Nightmare and Other Stories

Other Conan publications by Dark Horse

 Conan the Barbarian – The Mask of Acheron (2011 movie adaptation) Written by Stuart Moore. Art by Gabriel Guzman and Jason Gorder.
 Groo vs. Conan Written by Mark Evanier. Art by Tom Luth and Thomas Yeates.
Conan Exiles, by Michael Moreci, José Luis, and Andy Owens. Included in the Collector's edition of the videogame Conan Exiles.
Conan: The Swamp King - Published in Dark Horse Presents Vol 3. #21 (2016), Story and pencils by Aaron Lopresti, inks by Matt Banning.

References

External links
 Tim Truman in a podcast interview on the "reboot" of Conan the Cimmerian at comiXology
 All Conan Dark Horse comic covers
 Covers for books

2003 comics debuts
Conan the Barbarian comics
Eisner Award winners
Comics by Kurt Busiek
Dark Horse Comics

fr:Conan le barbare (comics)